Richardia brasiliensis is a species of flowering plant in the coffee family known by the English common names tropical Mexican clover, Brazilian calla-lily, white-eye, and Brazil pusley. In Brazil it is known as poaia branca. It is native to South America. It is an introduced species and sometimes an invasive weed in many other places, including Hawaii, Indonesia, Japan, and Thailand. It is a weed of citrus groves in Florida.

This plant may be an annual or perennial which grows from a deep root. The branching stems grow up to 40 centimeters long and lie prostrate or grow upright. The oppositely arranged leaves are oval with pointed or rounded tips. They are up to 6.5 centimeters long. The inflorescence is a cluster of up to 20 flowers, or sometimes more. The petals are white or rose-pink. The fruit is a hairy nutlet.

The root is often a home to nematodes.

In Brazil this plant is used medicinally as an antiemetic and for diabetes.

References

Spermacoceae